Storm Over the Nile is a 1955 British adventure film adaptation of the 1902 novel The Four Feathers, directed by Terence Young and Zoltan Korda. The film not only extensively used footage of the action scenes from the 1939 film version stretched into CinemaScope, but is a shot-for-shot, almost line-for-line remake of the earlier film, which was also directed by Korda. Several pieces of music by the original composer Miklos Rozsa were also utilized. It featured Anthony Steel, Laurence Harvey, James Robertson Justice, Mary Ure, Ian Carmichael, Michael Hordern and Christopher Lee. The film was shot on location in the Sudan.

Plot
Harry Faversham, as a sensitive child, is terrified by his father and his Crimean War veteran friends relating tales of cowardice that often ended in suicide. When he grows up, Harry follows his father's wishes and is commissioned in the Royal North Surrey Regiment. He also becomes engaged to marry the daughter of his father's friend, General Burroughs.

A year after his father's death, the North Surreys are given orders to deploy to the Sudan Campaign to join General Kitchener's forces to avenge General Gordon's death at Khartoum. Harry resigns his commission on the eve of his regiment's departure, whereupon he receives a white feather (a symbol of cowardice) from three of his fellow officers and his fiancée.

Unable to live as a coward, Harry contacts a sympathetic friend of his father's, Dr Sutton, to obtain his help and contacts to join the campaign in the Sudan. He meets Dr  Sutton's friend Dr Harraz in Egypt, who helps Harry disguise himself as a member of a tribe that had their tongues cut out for their treachery by the supporters of the Mahdi. Harry undergoes a branding on his forehead - a mark of shame identifying members of the tribe - and dyes his skin colour. This extreme course of action is required to conceal the fact that he cannot speak Arabic or any other native language.

In his guise as a native worker, Harry follows his old company, which has been ordered to create a diversion to distract the enemy. His former comrade and romantic rival, Captain Durrance, loses his helmet on a reconnaissance patrol. He is unable to retrieve it or move from a position facing the sun as a result of Sudanese searching for him. The hours he was forced to look at the hot sun make him blind.

Harry anonymously warns the company of the enemy's night assault, but is knocked unconscious. His company is wiped out, with Harry's former friends, the Subalterns Burroughs and Willoughby, captured by the enemy and imprisoned in Omdurman. Harry plays mute with the blind Durrance and guides him to British lines, then enters Omdurman to rescue his old friends.

Cast
 Anthony Steel as Harry Faversham
 Laurence Harvey as John Durrance
 James Robertson Justice as General Burroughs
 Mary Ure as Mary Burroughs
 Ronald Lewis as Peter Burroughs
 Ian Carmichael as Willoughby
 Jack Lambert as the Colonel
 Raymond Francis as the Colonel's aide
 Geoffrey Keen as Dr. Sutton
 Michael Hordern as General Faversham
 Ferdy Mayne as Dr. Harraz
 Christopher Lee as Karaga Pasha
 John Wynn as the Sergeant
 Avis Scott as the Sergeant's wife
 Roger Delgado as Native spy
 Frank Singuineau as Native servant
 Ben Williams as Faversham's butler
 Vincent Holman as Burroughs' butler
 Paul Streather as Harry Faversham as a boy
 N. Al Basri as Dervish
 M. H. Gadalla	as Dervish
 Michael Argy as Dervish
 Edwin Cary as Dervish
 John Laurie as the Khalifa (uncredited) (in a sequence taken from Korda's 1939 The Four Feathers, along with some of the battle scenes)
 Sam Kydd as Joe (uncredited)

Production
It was one of the last movies made by Alex Korda. The producer said he wanted to make films that were in colour and had big screen spectacle in order to entice audiences away from television.

Kenneth More says Alex Korda offered him a lead role in the film but he turned it down to appear in The Deep Blue Sea (1955) instead.

At one point it was going to be called None But the Brave.

Ann Miller was reportedly offered a role. It was the screen debut for Ronald Lewis who was signed to a contract by Korda after impressing on stage in Mourning Becomes Electra.

The film used locally posted British soldiers for some of the battle scenes.

Zoltan Korda reportedly complained the process of blowing up the old footage to CinemaScope "stretched the camels out until they looked like greyhounds."

Reception
Variety said it "places full emphasis on action".

Filmink said "Steel isn't terribly convincing as a coward, but he has heroic dash suitable for the part – he completely suits the universe of the movie (as opposed to co-star Laurence Harvey who always seems to be “acting”)."

References

External links
 
 
 

Films based on The Four Feathers
1955 films
British historical adventure films
British war films
CinemaScope films
1950s English-language films
Films set in the 1890s
Films set in London
Films set in Sudan
London Films films
Films directed by Terence Young
Films directed by Zoltán Korda
Films scored by Benjamin Frankel
Remakes of British films
1950s historical adventure films
1950s war films
Shot-for-shot remakes
1950s British films